The Estancia Maradona is a protected area in San Juan Province, Argentina, about  southwest of San Juan, Argentina.

In March 1831 an armed party of forty men under Nasario Benavides were making the Estancia de Don Manuel Maradona their base while preparing to return to San Juan during the Argentine Civil Wars.
Today, Estancia Maradona is an area where guanacos are conserved.  Due to its proximity to the city, poaching is a problem.
The land is rugged.  Although the estancia is private property, it is used without permission for recreation by people with all-terrain vehicles.

References

Populated places in San Juan Province, Argentina